Claramente is a Mexican comedy web television series co-produced by 11:11 Films and Claro Video. The series is produced by Juancho and Manolo Cardona, and it premiered via streaming on 14 November 2019. It stars Carolina Miranda, and Alejandro de la Madrid. The plot revolves around a group of people who work together in an old-fashioned magazine in which different generations converge, with conflicts of all kinds.

Plot 
Claramente revolves around Clara (Carolina Miranda), a journalist with a very peculiar gift: she can read the minds of men. However, this particular condition is an impediment for her to find love. But everything changes when she meets Emiliano (Alejandro de la Madrid), the only man she whose thoughts she cannot read.

Cast 
 Carolina Miranda as Clara
 Alejandro de la Madrid as Emiliano
 Otto Sirgo as Lázaro
 Silvia Mariscal as Matilde
 Laura Vieira as Gaby
 Adriana Montes de Oca as Eleanora
 Arturo Caslo as Pablo
 Tamara Vallarta as Giuseppina

References 

Spanish-language television shows
2010s Mexican television series
Mexican television sitcoms
Claro Video original programming
2019 Mexican television series debuts